Dr Warnasena Rasaputra (formerly known as Warnasena Rasaputram) (6 September 1927 – 25 June 2003) was a Sri Lankan economist and the seventh Governor of the Central Bank of Sri Lanka.

Biography
Warnasena Rasaputram was born on 6 September 1927 in the village of Yatiyana, near Matara, Sri Lanka, the son of Don Nicholas and Jane née Ratnayake. He was educated at St. Servatius' College, Matara and  Ananda College, Colombo.

After graduating from the University of Ceylon with a degree in economics with honours, specialising in statistics,  Rasaputra joined the Central Bank of Sri Lanka in 1951. In the late 1950s, he was successful in obtaining a Smith-Mundt Scholarship offered by the Institute of International Education and the United States Educational Foundation, and subsequently a Fulbright grant. He attended the University of Wisconsin, where in 1957 he obtained a master's degree in statistics and then doctor of philosophy in economics in 1959. He returned to the Central Bank and in 1968 was appointed director of economic research. In 1974 Rasaputram was appointed assistant to the governor and then deputy governor in 1975.

On 15 February 1979, Rasaputram became the seventh governor of the Central Bank of Sri Lanka, a position that he held for almost nine years. He assisted in guiding the country from a closed economy to an open market orientation. He also promoted the decentralisation of the Central Bank, setting up regional branches in Matara, Anuradhapura and Matale, and was also instrumental in establishing the Regional Development Banks. It was during his tenure that he changed his name to Rasaputra.

In November 1988 he resigned from his post as governor and was appointed as the Sri Lankan ambassador to France. He subsequently served as high commissioner to Malaysia and the permanent representative to the UN offices in Geneva and Vienna and also ambassador to the Vatican. His last posting was as ambassador to the United States. He resigned from this position in 2001 due to serious heart condition.

Personal life
Rasaputra married Jayanthi Sriya, with whom he had one child, Jaliya Gajaba.  Following Jayanthi's death he remarried Seetha Gopalan on 28 October 1977.

See also
 Governor of the Central Bank of Sri Lanka

References

1927 births
Sri Lankan economists
Alumni of the University of Ceylon (Colombo)
 University of Wisconsin–Madison College of Letters and Science alumni
Sinhalese civil servants
Permanent secretaries of Sri Lanka
Governors of the Central Bank of Sri Lanka
2003 deaths